Iquiri National Forest is a national forest in the state of Amazonas, Brazil. It is a sustainable use conservation unit, so harvesting of forest resources such as timber is allowed in accordance with a management plan.

Location

It is in the municipality of Lábrea in Amazonas.
The Iquiri National Forest is in the Amazon biome.
The forest contains 73.05% dense rainforest and 26.95 open rainforest.
It has great potential for sustainable harvesting of timber and other forest products such as oils, resins, nuts, seeds and fruits.

History

The Iquiri National Forest was created by decree on 8 May 2008 and is administered by the Chico Mendes Institute for Biodiversity Conservation (ICMBio).
It is classed as IUCN protected area category VI (protected area with sustainable use of natural resources) with the objective of sustainable multiple use of forest resources, maintenance and protection of water resources and biodiversity, recovery of degraded areas and support for sustainable exploitation of native forests and scientific research.

An ordinance of 9 January 2012 provided for a consistent and integrated approach to preparing management plans for the conservation units in the BR-319 area of influence. These are the Abufari Biological Reserve, Cuniã Ecological Station, Nascentes do Lago Jari and Mapinguari national parks, Balata-Tufari, Humaitá and Iquiri national forests, and the  Lago do Capanã-Grande, Rio Ituxi, Médio Purus and Lago do Cuniã extractive reserves.
An advisory council for the Iquiri forest was created on 26 October 2012.

Notes

Sources

National forests of Brazil